The  Rouen Baseball 76  is a French professional baseball team. Founded in 1986, the team competes in the top league in France. The Huskies home stadium is Terrain Pierre Rolland, located in the capital city of Normandy, Rouen. Rouen has won 15 French Championships in the last 17 years, establishing itself as one of the best teams in France and Europe. The Huskies won their 15th French title in August 2019, and trail only Paris as the most titled team in French history. Rouen is currently ranked as the number 6 team in Europe (as of February 2020).

Milestones 
 Champion of France : 2003, 2005, 2006, 2007, 2008, 2009, 2010, 2011, 2012, 2013, 2015, 2016, 2017, 2018, 2019
 Winner of Challenge of France : 2002, 2007, 2009, 2011, 2012, 2013, 2015, 2016, 2018
 Winner of CEB Cup : 2016, 2022
 Finalist in the Euro Cup (group A) : 2007, 2012
 European Final 4 : 2012
 European ranking (created in 2007) : 2007-4th; 2008-10th; 2009-4th; 2010-14th; 2011-15th; 2012-7th; 2013-12th, 2014-17th, 2015-8th, 2016-7th, 2017-9th, 2018-11th 2019-6th

History

Team Leadership 

The club was founded by Pierre Yves Rolland, Xavier Rolland, Marcel Brihiez and Charles Michel Do Marcolino in March 1986.

Xavier Rolland has served as president of the club since its inception, except for a one-year period in the 1990s when he was studying journalism in Paris. During that time, brother Pierre Yves Rolland assumed the presidency, assisted by Arnauld Lastel. Xavier's return to the team charted a new course for a team that had begun to suffer from sponsorship issues, financial problems and a lack of on-field success.

François Colombier, who joined the staff as vice-president in the mid-1990s would also be a name associated with Rouen baseball success in the ensuing years.  Rouen has been managed by the Venezuelan Keino Perez since 2012. In 2018, Perez, who guided Rouen to Challenge de France and French Finals titles along with a 4th-place finish in Rotterdam's Champions Cup, earned French manager of the year honors.

Stadium 

The Huskies first game was played versus the neighboring town Bois-Guillaume. Initially, all home games were played on Lacroix Island in the middle of the famous Seine River which splits the city of Rouen. In 1987, the Huskies moved to new and improved facilities in the St Exupéry area. It is here that the club remains to this day. In early 1987, the first home game against Caen only drew 700 fans, but its live broadcast on regional news channel France 3 Normandy made it the first baseball game ever televised in France. Terrain Pierre-Rolland was upgraded following the 2012 season and now features 300 individual seats, a pressbox and concession stand. The field dimensions are 325 feet down the lines and 390 feet to center field with a field turf infield and natural grass outfield.

In March 2014, the club opened a new state of the art indoor batting cage complex adjacent to Terrain Pierre-Rolland. MLB's baseball tomorrow fund contributed over $150,000 towards the project which allows for the team to train year round.

Uniform 

The Huskies home uniforms look similar to those of a legendary American League team, the New York Yankees, white with pinstripes. Their away uniforms are navy blue and red.  Rouen wears New Era caps and is sponsored by the Italian company, Macron.

Standout Players 

Pitchers Keino Perez and Robin Roy rank first and third for career wins with the club.  Roy, originally from Quebec, arrived in Rouen in 1991 and with the team as either player or coach until 2014.  Perez, from Venezuela, was a key starting pitcher for Rouen for over a decade.  In 2012, he was named manager, replacing Roy, while still pitching for the Huskies. For his career Perez, who still pitches from time to time, has logged 1,433.1 IP, allowing 1,099 H, 374 ER (2.34 ERA), while walking 391 and punching out 1,004 (thru 2019 season). His 117-32 career record places him atop the wins leaderboard in French D1 history. Perez recorded his 1,000th career strikeout with Rouen during the 2019 European Champions Cup in Bologna.

Outfielder Kenji Hagiwara attended Cochise College in Douglas, Arizona before returning to Rouen. Hagiwara compiled quite the career, batting .291 with 20 HR, 327 RBI and 185 SB.  The five tool outfielder won 14 French championships, last appearing in a game in 2018.

Luc Piquet, the club's longtime second baseman, led the Huskies franchise with 742 career hits in 705 games played, he scored 541 runs, hit 174 doubles, 63 triples, 8 home runs and drove in 447, to go with a .294 career batting average and 209 stolen bases. Piquet won a French record 15 French championships, his last coming in 2019.

Long-time catcher and captain Boris Marche was a key player for 11 of Rouen's 13 titles, his number 13 was retired in the summer of 2016. Marche was Rouen's capitan for many years before passing the torch to Piquet following his retirement.

Rouen outfielder Joris Bert became the first French player drafted by an MLB team (the Los Angeles Dodgers) in 2007. Bert, a speedy outfielder with good power, was released by Los Angeles in 2009, but not before paving the way for other French players to make their mark outside France.  After not appearing in a game since 2015, Bert announced he will make a comeback in 2021 at age 33.

Infielder Maxime Lefevre followed in Hagiwara's footsteps, also attending Cochise Junior College in 2011 and 2012.  He has been Rouen's and the National team's starting shortstop/third baseman since 2010.  In 2013, he played with the Quebec Capitales of the CAN-AM League, before returning to Rouen for the 2014 season. For his career in France Lefevre has a .314 lifetime average in 282 games played (1,022 AB), in which he has 321 hits, 292 runs scored, 67 doubles, 16 triples, 12 home runs, 247 RBI and 141 stolen bases (thru 2019 season).

In 2011 Owen Ozanich, the first and only French-born player to play NCAA Division 1 baseball, joined Rouen where he played for 8 seasons, winning 7 championships.  In the 2011–12 and 2012–13 off-seasons Ozanich played in Australia where he was called up to Adelaide of the Australia Baseball League in January 2012. In September 2012 he started France's second game in the 2012 World Baseball Classic Qualifier against South Africa throwing three no hit innings. In March 2015 Ozanich was named to the European All-Star team which travelled to Japan to face world number 1 Samurai Japan in a two-game series at the Tokyo Dome. In April 2015 Ozanich threw the only perfect game in French D1 history. In November 2015 Ozanich led team Europe in innings pitched, ERA and strikeouts during the Asian Winter League in Taiwan. For his career with the Huskies he went 91-15 with 748 strikeouts and a 1.53 ERA from 2011-2018 before moving onto Parma of the Italian Serie A and now Montpellier, Rouen's southern rival in the French D1.

Yoann Vaugelade has emerged as a key pitcher for the Huskies since his rookie season in 2013. Vaugelade was named 2013 Finals MVP after Rouen topped Senart in the French Series. He has remained a key starting pitcher for the French National team as well, starting against Panama in the World Baseball Classic Qualifiers. For his career with the Huskies, Vaugelade has logged 438.0 IP, allowed 398 H, 147 ER (3.02 ERA), the tall righty's record stands at is 37-19, he has walked 160 and picked up 241 strikeouts (thru 2019 season).

Success of the 2000s 

In 2001, the team is entrusted to manager Sylvain Virey. Many new faces join veterans Robin Roy and Yann Monnet. The team starts well, but is devastated when Québécois Joce Blais leaves Rouen to sign a pro contract with the Quebec Capitales in the middle of the season. His replacement, American Andy Justice, immediately provides the spark the club needed. The club dominates Division 2. Robin Roy pitches Rouen past Cherbourg on his way to being named MVP. The Huskies are now once again promoted to Division 1. In the fall, "baby baseball" and mixed softball are promotions rolled out to generate interest in the game.

In 2002, The Huskies returned to glory under the direction of new head coach Patrice Plante. Rouen recorded a 29-1 record during the French regular season. The club also took home the inaugural Challenge of France with a victory over Paris Université Club. This victory qualified the club for the Euro Cup which would take place in Barcelona the following June. Rouen lost the French Championship to rival Savigny, however.

Following the conclusion of the 2002 season, Rouen GM Xavier Rolland replaced Plante with a new head coach, Christian Chénard, a native of Quebec, who arrived in Rouen in March 2003. That summer, once again competing in the Challenge of France, the Huskies recorded two easy victories against Guerche (17-1) and Cherbourg (15-1). The club then proceeded to beat Montpellier 5-0  before finally losing to Savigny 4-2. President Rolland recruited Andre Tremblay to bolster the team pitching staff in preparation for its first Euro Cup, held in Barcelona, however the Huskies finished sixth in the tournament. Back in France, a doubleheader split against Montpellier ensured a second consecutive first place regular season finish. The Huskies beat Paris in the semi-finals before facing rival Savigny in championship series. Rouen finally beat Savigny and claimed its first title. The Huskies were now the top team in France.

In 2004, the club won the European B Cup (a lesser competition compared to the A Cup), but failed to defend its title as French champions.

In 2005, the Huskies were led by pitcher Keino Perez of Venezuela and they claimed their second French championship while also finishing second in the Challenge de France.

In 2006, Huskies won a second Euro B Cup while also preserving their title of champion of France. The team finished 27-5 in the regular season before beating Savigny and Toulouse to claim the championship. The French title along with the successful Euro B Cup result will allow Rouen to participate in the 2007 Euro A Cup.

On June 16, 2007 the Huskies reached the championship game of the Euro A Cup against the Dutch squad Kinhiem.  In a hard-fought game, the Huskies lose 3-1 in what remains the furthest a French team has ever gone in Europe. Rouen is the first non-Italian/non-Dutch team since 1976 to reach the tournament final. Rouen came back to France with great confidence, won the Challeng de France and finished the regular season in first place with a 20-4 record. They ousted Montpellier and Senart to become the undisputed top club in France and one of the top 10 clubs in Europe. Their pitching staff, led once again by Roy and Perez, dominated French batters.

A Huskies Dynasty 

The 2008 season ends with a 22-6 second place regular season finish for Rouen.  The 2009 season saw the Huskies finish the regular season 25-3 and in first place. Catcher and now captain Boris Marche, the youngest ever French National Team player, led the team to another French championship, this time over rival Savigny. In the 2010 season, the final one on the mound for Robin Roy, ended with a 17-7 regular season record and a seventh championship for the Huskies. Roy finished his career as probably the best pitcher in French history. Canadian infielder Aaron Hornostaj and newly acquired French pitcher Anthony Piquet also stepped up with great seasons.

In 2011, Roy retired as a player and took over as head coach of the Huskies, replacing Francois Colombier.  After a relatively rough start to the season and a disappointing Euro Cup finish, American slugger Rickey Thomas and French-American pitcher Owen Ozanich helped Rouen to a sweep through the Challenge de France, going 5-0, with Jordan Crystal taking home MVP honors, Bert best hitter and Ozanich best pitcher. Rouen finished third in the regular season with a 19-9 record before finding its groove in the playoffs, ousting Toulouse, Savigny and Montpellier. Rouen was down two-games to none to Montpellier in the finals before winning three straight. President Xavier Rolland called this championship "one of the sweetest."

Rouen as a European Power 

Roy's son Alexandre, who pitched sparingly for the squad in 2011, signed with the Seattle Mariners in February 2012. Alexandre became the youngest French player and the first French pitcher to sign professionally. Captain Boris Marche and longtime infielder Luc Piquet traveled to Southern Japan in March to take part in spring training with a professional team.  Infielder Maxime Lefevre returned home from Cochise College in Arizona and added solid defense and speed to the lineup. Quentin Becquey and Oscar Combes rejoined the Huskies and made significant contributions to a squad which qualified for its first ever European Final 4 in Nettuno, Italy by finishing 4-1 in the Rotterdam Pool A Euro Cup.

The 2012 season was very successful for Rouen.  Keino Perez took over as player-manager, replacing Roy at the helm while still contributing on the field as a starting pitcher and managing the team to a 41-6 overall record.  With the help of imports Chris Mezger, Ethan Paquette, Mat Smith, along with the usual solid play from their French players, Rouen won the 2012 Challenge de France and 2012 French Championship. Owen Ozanich posted the lowest ERA in the regular season, Mezger finished first in wins and second in strikeouts while Paquette finished first in all the offensive triple crown categories, edging out teammate Luis Aponte for the batting title. Mezger was named MVP of the Challenge de France and best pitcher of the finals, while Paquette was named best hitter and MVP of the finals as Rouen topped Senart three games to one to claim its ninth French title.

In September 2012, the French National Team participated in the European Championships in the Netherlands as well as in the World Baseball Classic qualifier in Jupiter, Florida. Rouen players Joris Bert, Maxime Lefevre, Boris Marche, Luc Piquet, Anthony Piquet and Owen Ozanich were on the rosters for both the European Championships and the World Baseball Classic, Keino Perez joined the six in Florida for the WBC qualifier.

The 2013 Huskies turned to Venezuelan pitcher Jose Rodriguez and French-American Owen Ozanich to anchor the pitching staff along with longtime pitcher Keino Perez and newcomer Yoann Vaugelade (2013 Finals MVP). Ozanich took home his second consecutive ERA title, also finishing 10-0 for the second consecutive season. Rodriguez shined in the playoffs when the team needed him most, and Perez was named best pitcher in the Challenge de France. Rodriguez pitched as high as AAA while Perez pitched in A ball before moving to Europe.  Perez stands atop the all-time wins list in France with 115 victories and counting for the Huskies. New stadium improvements were completed and terrain Pierre Rolland now features lighting and 300 individual seats along with a snack bar for Huskies fans. Another first-place finish (24-4 record) and a sweep through the Challenge de France (4-0 record) highlighted the regular season.  The team finished a disappointing 1-4 in the European Cup although many key players were missing from the lineup. The offense was led by familiar names Boris Marche (2013 Challenge de France MVP), Luc Piquet, Maxime Lefevre, Mathew Smith, Oscar Combes, Kenji Hagiwara, David Gauthier, Joris Bert, Quentin Becquey and Luis Aponte. Newcomer Brian Ramirez excelled in finals, taking home the award given to the best hitter.  Rouen and Senart faced off in a rematch of the 2012 D1 finals, with Rouen claiming the series 3 games to 2 to capture their 10th title.  Rouen's season concluded in late September when they hosted Moscow and Antwerp in the 2014 European A Cup qualifier. Rouen won both games on their home field to remain in the 2014 A Cup. They welcomed back infielder Maxime Lefevre who spent the majority of the season in North America and won the CAN-AM title after a successful rookie season with the Quebec Capitales.

Defeat and Revenge 

2014 saw the Huskies finished with an overall record of 28-14. However, Rouen's run as French champions came to an end. After a tough start to the regular season, the Rouen Huskies finished third at the Challenge de France with a 3-1 record.  In June, they finished third in the Hoofddorp pool of the European Cup, posting a 3-2 record, with wins over Prague, Nettuno and Solingen.  Venezuelan infielder Domingo Morillo and American pitcher Jason Daniels joined utility men Brian Ramirez and Jordan Rogers to fill the team's foreign slots for the 2014 season. The Huskies finished the French regular season with a 20-8 record, good for third place behind Paris and Montpellier.  Capitan Boris Marche led the team in hitting, finishing with a .396 average, just ahead of Maxime Lefevre (.370) and Kenji Hagiwara (.365).  On the mound, Keino Perez (6-1, 1.10 ERA), Jason Daniels (6-3, 1.78 ERA) and Owen Ozanich (4-0, 2.06 ERA) carried the pitching staff.  Rouen fell to a strong Paris team in the semi-finals to snap their run as French champs. Ozanich, Lefevre, Marche, Arthur Paturel and Yoann Vaugelade represented the Huskies on the French National team at the 2014 European Championships.  Huskies head coach Keino Perez was a member of the team France coaching staff.

The 2015 Huskies team dominated France during the regular season, finishing in first place with a 27-1 record and sweeping through the Challenge de France with a 4-0 record. Rouen beat Montpellier in the 2015 French Series in four games to earn the title of champion of France. Failing to win either the Challenge or Finals in 2014 had Keino Perez and his players hungry to prove they were still the top team in France. Rouen was led by familiar names along with a sold trio of foreign players. Maxime Lefevre led the team with a .418 average, former AAA shortstop Larry Infante led the league with four homers and 35 RBI in 28 games. Kevin Lusson played a solid first base, batting .340 with 25 RBI. The pitching staff was led by former single A pitcher Jeffrey McKenzie, who broke Ozanich's single season ERA mark, going 10-0 with a lead leading 0.23 ERA. McKenzie was also named 2015 Challenge de France MVP. Ozanich, who in April pitched the first perfect game in French history, tied with McKenzie for the league lead in wins (10) while posting a 1.40 ERA. He was named finals MVP with a 2-0 record, 1.80 ERA and 15 K in two outings. Young pitchers Esteban Prioul and Yoann Vaugelade were solid out of the bullpen, while Keino Perez and Chilean pitcher Pablo Ossandon also contributed, with Perez taking home the best pitcher award in the Challenge de France and Ossandon posting a 1.64 ERA in his first season in Europe.

Following the final victory over Montpellier in September 2015, longtime catcher and captain of the Huskies, Boris Marche announced he would retire. Marche's leadership and talent were instrumental to Rouen's rise to power over the last fifteen years. Along with being the captain of the most successful club team in France, Marche was the captain of the French national team, a team he first suited up for at age 17. Marche's retires as a 12-time champion (11 with Rouen), he batted .308 for his career, notching 597 hits, while scoring 422 runs and driving in 486. The club retired his number 13 on June 5, 2016.

In the winter of 2015, pitcher Owen Ozanich, along with now-Rouen teammate Leonel Cespedes represented France on Team Europe in the 2015 Asia Winter League. The two were the only French players selected.

2016 "The Triple Crown" 

Following a very successful 2015 season, Keino Perez's Rouen Huskies kept their spot at the top of the French League. After losing Boris Marche and David Gauthier (retirement) along with Quentin Becquey, Jeffrey McKenzie and Kevin Lusson, the Huskies managed to finish first yet again with a 24-3 regular season record in 2016. Rouen welcomed back longtime French National team pitcher Anthony Piquet, who won three titles with the club from 2010-2012. Along with Piquet, the pitching staff was composed of Owen Ozanich, Yoann Vaugelade, Marc-Andre Habeck, Pablo Ossandon, Esteban Prioul and Keino Perez. Dylan Gleeson and Venezuelan slugger Jonathan Jaspe (2016 Challenge de France MVP & FFBS All-Star Game MVP) were the Huskies primary catchers. Arthur Paturel started the majority of the games at first base and hit .338 on the season. Team captain Luc Piquet played second, while Venezuelan slugger Larry Infante manned shortstop, taking home the 2016 Batting Title. French National team third baseman Maxime Lefevre played the hot corner. The outfield featured Andrew Medeiros (.368, 3 HR, 22 SB), Kenji Hagiwara, Oscar Combes, Derek Cornell and Bastien Dagneau, with Sebastien Duchossoy getting the majority of his at bats as DH for 2016 Huskies. Along with finishing first in the regular season, the Huskies swept through the Challenge de France, beating Clermond-Ferrand, Toulouse, Montpellier and Senart behind very strong pitching (0.26 team ERA). Along with Jaspe being named MVP of the Challenge, Ozanich was named best pitcher after throwing a one-hit shutout against Montpellier. Yoann Vaugelade pitched seven strong innings to top Senart in the final. In June's CEB Cup hosted in Rouen, the Huskies won all five games to capture the cup. They beat fellow French team Montpellier 5-2 in the final. Rouen's Larry Infante was named tournament MVP after hitting 3 home runs in the five games, Owen Ozanich won best pitcher after his complete game shutout against Karlovac. To recap the 2016 regular season, Infante was the league's top hitter, Medeiros led the FFBS in runs scored, and Ozanich led in wins, WHIP and ERA.

The Huskies swept Toulouse three games to none in the semi-finals. Rouen then went on and won their 12th French title, beating rival Senart three games to one. Outfielder Oscar Combes was named French Series MVP. Following the end of the French Series, many Huskies players went on to represent the team at the European Championships with France: Pitchers Owen Ozanich, Marc-Andre Habeck, Yoann Vaugelade and Anthony Piquet made the squad. Position players Dylan Gleeson, Bastien Dagneau, Luc Piquet and Maxime Lefevre were all starters for les Bleus. In November and December 2016, pitchers Marc-Andre Habeck and Owen Ozanich represented Rouen/France on Team Europe which played in the 2016 Asia Winter League in Taiwan.

2017 "The Champions Cup" 

In October 2016 the Huskies announced they had signed French-Cuban pitcher/outfielder Leonel Cespedes. A key member of the national team and longtime starter for France, Cespedes joined an already strong pitching staff. This season, Rouen's focus was on the Champions Cup and defending their French title. Also back in Rouen in 2017 were Venezuelans Larry Infante and Jonathan Jaspe. Infante returned for his third season with the club, while Jaspe, MVP of both the Challenge de France and All-Star Game in 2016, returned for a second season with the Huskies. The rest of the lineup featured familiar faces Dylan Gleeson at catcher, Luc Piquet and Maxime Lefevre in the infield. The outfield was made up of Kenji Hagiwara, Valentin Durier, Cespedes and Oscar Combes. Sebastien Duchossoy filled in as Rouen's utility man, while newcomers Hugo Blondel and Maxime Nutte got some AB's off the bench.

Rouen's pitching was a key reason why Rouen finished the regular season in first place with a 26-2 record. Ozanich (7-1, 1.08 ERA) again led all French pitchers in wins, ERA, WHIP and strikeouts, Vaugelade (3-1, 2.30 ERA) was effective out of the bullpen, lefty Esteban Prioul (6-0, 1.52 ERA) confirmed his status as the top lefthanded pitching prospect in France, plus former AAA and Venezuelan national team hurler Jean Granados (8-0, 2.21 ERA) led the staff, with Cespedes (1-0, 1.93 ERA) and the veteran righty Keino Perez (1-0, 0.92 ERA) very productive when called upon as well. Rouen swept their way into the French Series with a semi-finals win over Montigny. In the 2017 French Series, the Huskies topped Senart three games to two with a thrilling 9-8 win in the decisif game 5 in Rouen. The 2017 Huskies finished 36-7 overall.

2018 "The Playoff Sweep" 

The 2018 version of the Huskies featured a mixture of old and new. Returning to the squad was 1B/DH David Gauthier, who, after two years off, added a powerful bat and clubhouse leadership to the club he played for from 2006-2015. The club added SS/3B Miguel Mendez, utility player Johan Carias, and the two way player Gerwuins Velazco, who joined the Huskies after a season with Tenerife in Spain. Also joining the club was French youngster Louis Brainville. Current Huskies captain Luc Piquet, Kenji Hagiwara, Dylan Gleeson and Maxime Lefevre all solidified the Rouen lineup. Gone was longtime outfielder and Oscar Combes.  Youngsters Jose Andres Paula, Valentin Durier, and the veteran Hagiwara manned the Huskies' outfield, with Hugo Blondel providing quality AB's from the right side of the plate when needed. The pitching staff was led by Owen Ozanich and Venezuelan starter Kender Villegas. The bullpen was anchored by Yoann Vaugelade and Esteban Prioul. The Huskies, led by manager Keino Perez and assistant coach Francois Colombier, finished second in the North Sea Cup held in Den Haag, NL, where they notably 3x defending European champions Curaçao Neptunus by the score of 2-1. On May 13 the Huskies won their 9th Challenge de France, defeating Senart 13-5 in the final held in Valenciennes. Catcher Dylan Gleeson was named Challenge MVP after catching all five games and batting .476 in the week long tournament.
 
Outfielder Leo Cespedes joined the club in time for the European Cup which was held in Rotterdam, where the Huskies surprised Amsterdam and Heidenheim on their way to a 4th-place finish. Rouen lost 4-0 to the eventual champions (Curaçao Neptunus) in the semi-finals. Starting pitcher Owen Ozanich represented Rouen in the 2018 All-Star Game alongside fellow team France selections Dylan Gleeson and Jose Paula (who homered in his first at bat with the national team). The French trio faced fellow Huskies teammates Miguel Mendez, Gerwuins Velazco, and Kender Villegas (Team World). The Huskies finished the regular season in 4th place with a 15-9 record in France. In September, they opened the playoffs at home where they swept Savigny in the quarter finals before sweeping their rivals Senart in the semi-finals.  In the finals, catcher Gerwuins Velazco homered twice off of Montigny starting pitcher Yorfrank Lopez to back Rouen starter Owen Ozanich, who was named finals MVP after allowing just one run in 16.2 innings, punching out 18 along the way, leading the Huskies to an undefeated 8-0 run in the playoffs, the first for any French club. Ozanich and Villegas led the Huskies pitching staff in all categories. Ozanich (13-2, 1.38 ERA, 24 BB, 126 K) and the Venezuelan Villegas (10-0, 1.79 ERA, 24 BB, 109 K) both pitched in winter ball following the 2018 season, Villegas in Venezuela, Ozanich in Chile. Rouen's offense was led by Gerwuins Velazco (.357, 4 HR, 33 RBI), Miguel Mendez (.344, 2 HR, 40 RBI) and David Gauthier (.306, 3 HR, 26 RBI).

2019 "Piquet's final season" 

The 2019 version of the Huskies used a strong lineup and spectacular pitching to maintain their spot as one of the top 2 teams in France. Former Tampa Bay Rays minor league infielder Ariel Soriano led the offense with a .355/.492/.409 slash line with 3 HR and 20 RBI. Venezuelan Junior Sosa solidified the outfield, while hitting .360/.640/.459 with 6 HR and 24 RBI. French slugger Bastien Dagneau picked up where he left off, in his first season back with the club the power hitting outfielder hit .340/.651/.486 with 7 HR and 30 RBI. Veteran French national team players Maxime Lefevre (.304/.468/.411) Luc Piquet (.301/.344/.427), and David Gauthier (.296/.479/.457) also produced solid seasons for Rouen. Catcher Dylan Gleeson (.263/.368/.387) battled injuries in this his 8th season with the club. Youngsters Louis Brainville, Auguste Guern, Rodrigue Louvry, Martin Vissac, Gabriel Harrison and Luc Viger provided depth off the bench for Keino Perez's 2019 squad.

The pitching staff was anchored by Venezuelan newcomer, Yoimer Camacho. The right handed hurler did not disappointed in his first go around in the FFBS, posting a 13-0 record to go with a 0.75 ERA. Longtime Huskies pitchers Yoann Vaugelade (3-1, 0.44 ERA), Esteban Prioul (5-0, 1.68 ERA), and Keino Perez (1-0, 3.44 ERA), Venezuelan south paw Ely Izturriaga (3-5, 0.91 ERA) and youngster Quentin Moulin (1-0, 3.47 ERA) also made important contributions. The club's achillies heal was their staff's performance in big moments. Whereas the club pitched to a 1.44 team ERA in the regular season and playoffs, that mark went up to 4.75 in the Challenge de France (where Senart beat Rouen in the final), and 9.75 in the European Cup, where thanks to a brilliant Keino Perez (1-0 record, 2.70 ERA in team high 10.0 IP) the club managed to go 2-2 and salvage a 5th-place finish. In Rouen's second win in the Champions Cup, the longtime hurler and now manager logged his 1,000th career strikeout with the club.

2020 "France's lost season"

On May 6, 2020 the FFBS announced the cancellation of the official Division 1 2020 season due to the Coronavirus pandemic.

Rouen was scheduled to participate in the 2020 European Champions Cup in Ostrava, Czech Republic.

Keino Perez's squad will be without Luc Piquet and Bastien Dagneau (retirement), but also Junior Sosa and Ariel Soriano. Soriano, Rouen's power hitting infielder has made the move to Italy where he is currently playing for Nettuno. The club decided not to bring back Sosa after it was announced that the official D1 season would be cancelled in 2020.

While the official season is a no go, the Huskies announced they would send an all French player team to participate in the Suzanne Bricaud Challenge, a short season which will start on September 6, 2020 and end with a best of three finals on November 8. The 6 team league will play all their games on weekends in greater Paris and Rouen. Ace Venezuelan pitcher Yoimer Camacho also will not be a part of the Huskies, as the club has decided to go with only French talent for the 14 game exhibition season.

Star players Maxime Lefevre, David Gauthier and Joris Bert, who returns to the diamond after several years away from the game, have announced they will play in 2020. Rouen will open on September 6 in Paris, and will play their first home games in Rouen on September 20 against Savigny.

Pitchers

Esteban Prioul

Yoann Vaugelade

Quentin Moulin

Keino Perez

Benjamin Patry

Loic Patry

Thibault Mercadier

Catchers

Dylan Gleeson

Louis Brainville

Infielders

Hugo Blondel

David Gauthier

Maxime Lefevre

Auguste Guern

Luc Viger

Gabriel Harrison

Outfielders

Valentin Durier

Joris Bert

Rodrigue Louvry

Martin Vissac

See also
Baseball awards#France

References

External links 
Official Club Site (French)

Baseball teams established in 1986
Division Élite teams
1986 establishments in France
Sport in Rouen